Flavia Maxima Fausta Augusta (289–326 AD) was a Roman empress. She was the daughter of Maximian and second wife of Constantine the Great, who had her executed and excluded from all official accounts for unknown reasons. Historians Zosimus and Zonaras reported that she was executed for adultery with her stepson, Crispus.

Family
Fausta was the daughter of Emperor Maximian. To seal the alliance between them for control of the Tetrarchy, in 307 Maximianus married her to Constantine I, who set aside his wife, Minervina, in her favour. As the sister of Emperor Maxentius, Fausta had a part in their father's downfall. In 310 Maximian died as a consequence of an assassination plot against Constantine. Maximian decided to involve his daughter Fausta, but she revealed the plot to her husband, and the assassination was disrupted. Maximian died, by suicide or by assassination, in July of that same year.

Fausta was held in high esteem by Constantine, and proof of his favour was that in 324 she was proclaimed augusta; previously she held the title of nobilissima femina. Their sons became emperors: Constantine II, Constantius II, r. 337–361, and Constans, r. 337–350. She also bore three daughters: Constantina, Helena and Fausta. Of these, Constantina married her cousins, firstly Hannibalianus and secondly Constantius Gallus, and Helena married Emperor Julian.

Execution
In 326, Fausta was put to death by Constantine, following the execution of Crispus, his eldest son by Minervina. The circumstances surrounding the two deaths were unclear. Various explanations have been suggested; in one, Fausta is set jealously against Crispus, as in the anonymous Epitome de Caesaribus, or conversely her adultery, perhaps with the stepson who was close to her in age, is suggested.

According to the Latin Epitome de Caesaribus and the Ecclesiastical History of Philostorgius (as epitomized by Photius), Fausta was executed by being locked in a bath which was over heated, in connection with the death of Crispus, which "people [thought]" was caused by Fausta's accusation of unclear nature. But Constantine, having obtained rule over the whole Roman Empire by remarkable success in wars, ordered his son Crispus to be put to death, at the behest (so people think) of his wife Fausta. Later he locked his wife Fausta in overheated baths and killed her, because his mother Helena blamed him out of excessive grief for her grandson.

Zosimus, on the other hand, suggests adultery as the reason: He killed Crispus, who had been deemed worthy of the rank of Caesar, as I have said before, when he incurred suspicion of having sexual relations with his stepmother Fausta, without taking any notice of the laws of nature. Constantine’s mother Helena was distressed at such a grievous event and refused to tolerate the murder of the young man. As if to soothe her [feelings] Constantine tried to remedy the evil with a greater evil: having ordered baths to be heated above the normal level, he deposited Fausta in them and brought her out when she was dead.

Gregory of Tours reports that the pair plotted treason. In Zonaras' version written in the 12th century, Crispus' death was caused by Fausta's retaliatory accusation of rape following her unsuccessful sexual advances toward him. But when Constantine realized his innocence, he punished her, mirroring the myth of Phaedra and Hippolytus.

The mode of her assassination is not otherwise attested in the Roman world. David Woods departs from the traditional view that Crispus and Fausta were executed and offers the connection of overheated bathing with contemporaneous techniques of abortion, a suggestion that implies an unwanted, adulterous pregnancy from her relationship with Crispus and a fatal accident during the abortion.

 
Constantine I ordered the damnatio memoriae of Fausta and Crispus around 326 with the result that no contemporary source records details of her fate: "Eusebius, ever the sycophant, mentions neither Crispus nor Fausta in his Life of Constantine, and even wrote Crispus out of the final version of his Ecclesiastical History (HE X.9.4)", Constantine's biographer Paul Stephenson observes. However, in 355/6, Julian praised Fausta's beauty, nobility, and moral virtue in his panegyric to Constantius II, revealing that the damnatio memoriae may have been lifted during the reign of her son.

In popular culture
Fausta is an important antagonist in Dorothy L. Sayers' chronicle-play The Emperor Constantine (1951). In addition, Fausta was portrayed by Belinda Lee in the film Constantine and the Cross (1961).

Notes

References

Bibliography 
  Jean-Luc Desnier , Zosime II, 29 et la mort de Fausta, Bulletin de l'Association Guillaume Budé, n°3, octobre 1987. pp. 297–309 read on line.
  Esteban Moreno Resano, 'Las ejecuciones de Crispo, Licinio el Joven y Fausta (año 326 d.C.): nuevas observaciones', Dialogues d'histoire ancienne, vol.41, n° 1 (2015) pp. 177-200 read on line.
 Gérard Minaud, Les vies de 12 femmes d’empereur romain – Devoirs, Intrigues & Voluptés , Paris, L’Harmattan, 2012, ch. 12,  La vie de Fausta, femme de Constantin, pp. 285–305.
 J.W. Drijvers, 'Flavia Maxima Fausta: Some Remarks', Historia 41 (1992) 500–506.

External links 

 

289 births
326 deaths
Constantinian dynasty
Flavii
Deaths from asphyxiation
Executed Roman empresses
Murdered Roman empresses
3rd-century Roman women
4th-century Roman empresses
Constantine the Great
4th-century executions
People executed by the Roman Empire
Damnatio memoriae
Nobilissimi
People executed for adultery